Electoral district of Doveton was an electoral district of the Legislative Assembly in the Australian state of Victoria.

Members

Election results

References
Re-Member database Parliament of Victoria

Former electoral districts of Victoria (Australia)
1985 establishments in Australia
1992 disestablishments in Australia
Constituencies established in 1985
Constituencies disestablished in 1992